Kattathur (North) is a village in the Udayarpalayam taluk of Ariyalur district, Tamil Nadu, India.

Demographics 

As per the 2001 census, Kattathur (North) had a total population of 1982 with 1000 males and 982 females.

References 

Villages in Ariyalur district